Narayan Pandit (Hindi: नारायण पण्डित), or Narayana, was the Brāhmaṇa author of the Sanskrit treatise called Hitopadesha — a  work based primarily on the Panchatantra, one of the oldest collection of stories, mainly animal fables, in the world. Narayana's dates are not known, but scholarly consensus places the composition of the Hitopadesha at around 800 to 950 CE. The last lines of the book indicate the name of the author as Narayan Pandit:

नारायणेन प्रचरतु रचितः संग्रहोsयं कथानाम्

Narayan Pandit was the royal poet of Dhawalchandra, the king of Bengal. The beginning and ending shlokas of the book indicate the deep faith of Narayan Pandit in lord Shiva.

See also
Vishnu Sharma
Indian writers

Notes

References

External links
 Hitopadesh - Indira Gandhi Rashtriya Kala Kendra
 English translation of Hitopadesh by E. Arnold
 Second, third and fourth part of Hitopadesh (With English translation by Fredric Max Muler)

Indian Hindus
Sanskrit writers
Indian religious writers
9th-century Indian writers
10th-century Indian writers